Jo Valentine is the name of:

a pen name for Charlotte Armstrong
Jo Valentine, Baroness Valentine (born 1958), member of the British House of Lords

See also 
Jo Vallentine (born 1946), Australian Senator
Joe Valentine (born 1979), baseball player